DC Moore may refer to:
Detective Constable Moore, a character from Coronation Street
D. C. Moore, a British playwright